Leptostylus faulkneri is a species of beetle in the family Cerambycidae. It was described by Hovore in 1988.

References

Leptostylus
Beetles described in 1988